Mirror is a studio album by French jazz pianist and composer Jacky Terrasson. Blue Note released the album on August 28, 2007. The album is a collection of his solo tracks: seven jazz standards and five originals.

Reception
Thomas Conrad of JazzTimes stated, "It is easy to hear why Jacky Terrasson is often cited as an influence and inspiration by other young pianists. Track by track on Mirror, he postulates problems for himself, solves them brilliantly, and demonstrates what is pianistically possible if you have chops of doom." Ken Dryden of AllMusic observed, "Mirror provides a rare opportunity to enjoy Terrasson in a solo piano setting. He recasts the old favorite from the Duke Ellington songbook by mixing a different vamp, adding an ominous tremolo and even taking breaks to tap on the piano's wood surface, while never losing his focus on its theme and delivering a fresh, exciting interpretation."

All About Jazz review by Doug Collette commented, "Mirror is a thing of beauty. Terrasson has proven himself a courageously proficient jazz musician on his previous recordings, but this new project is a step above what he's done before. Many solo piano albums tend to be either too stark or too directionless, but Terrasson's is purposeful and deep with passion. There's a sense of spontaneity that comes and goes within his playing that contrasts beautifully with a more formal approach..." Will Layman of PopMatters added, "What Jacky Terrasson has always had is a delicate, striking touch at the piano and a gift for non-clichéd melodic invention. Playing solo, his spark is obvious on certain songs. But a solo set also opens Terrasson to proper critique. His ideas too often have a perversity about them."

Track listing

Charts

References

2007 albums
Blue Note Records albums
Jacky Terrasson albums